The House of Buxhoeveden was a Baltic German noble family of Lower Saxon origin in Estonia and Russian Empire, with roots tracing to Bexhövede. In Sweden, the family is considered part of the unintroduced nobility.

Notable family members 
 Albert of Riga (1165–1229), third Bishop of Riga, founder of the Livonian Brothers of the Sword
 Hermann of Dorpat (1163–1248), first Bishop of Dorpat
 Reinhold von Buxhoeveden (est. 1480s-1557), was bishop of the Bishopric of Saare-Lääne from 1532 to 1541.
 Friedrich Wilhelm von Buxhoevden (1750–1811), Russian Infantry General
 Baroness Sophie Buxhoeveden (1883–1956), lady in waiting to Tsarina Alexandra of Russia
 Arthur von Buxhoevden (1882–1964), Baltic-German military personnel (Colonel).

Gallery 

 
Baltic nobility